The Women's Shot Put event at the 2001 World Championships in Edmonton, Alberta, Canada was held on Sunday August 5, 2001. There were a total number of 20 participating athletes, with the qualification mark set at 18.40 metres.

Medalists

Schedule
All times are Mountain Standard Time (UTC-7)

Abbreviations
All results shown are in metres

Records

Qualification

Group A

Group B

Final

See also
2001 Shot Put Year Ranking
2002 European Championships

References
 Results
 IAAF

Shot Put
Shot put at the World Athletics Championships
2001 in women's athletics